In most English-speaking countries, a long weekend is a three or four day weekend.

Long Weekend may also refer to:

Film and television 
 The Long Weekend, a 2005 Canadian film starring Chris Klein and Brendan Fehr
 Long Weekend (1978 film), an Australian horror film
 Long Weekend (2008 film), an Australian remake of the 1978 film
 "The Long Weekend" (American Dragon: Jake Long), an episode of American Dragon: Jake Long
 "Long Weekend" (Mad Men), an episode of Mad Men
 The Long Weekend (O' Despair), a 1989 film directed by Gregg Araki
 Long Weekend (2021 film), an American film directed by Steven Basilone

Literature 
 The Long Week-End, a 1940 social history of Britain between the World Wars, by Robert Graves and Alan Hodge

See also 
 Interwar period, the period between the end of World War I and the beginning of World War II in Europe (1918–1939) 
 The Lost Weekend (disambiguation)